Cyperus rubicundus is a species of sedge that is native to parts of the Africa, Middle East, Asia and Australia.

See also 
 List of Cyperus species

References 

rubicundus
Plants described in 1805
Taxa named by Martin Vahl
Flora of India
Flora of Queensland
Flora of Angola
Flora of Burundi
Flora of South Africa
Flora of Djibouti
Flora of Eritrea
Flora of Ethiopia
Flora of Kenya